Terence Allan Crawford (born September 28, 1987) is an American professional boxer. He has held multiple world championships in three weight classes, including the WBO welterweight title since 2018. Previously he held the WBO and Ring magazine lightweight titles from 2014 to 2015; and the unified WBA (Super), WBC, IBF, WBO and Ring light welterweight titles between 2015 and 2017.

In August 2017, Crawford had a short reign as the undisputed light welterweight champion, prior to moving up to welterweight. He was the first undisputed champion at light welterweight since Kostya Tszyu in 2004. Crawford also became the first male boxer to simultaneously hold all four major world titles in boxing (WBA, WBC, IBF and WBO) since Jermain Taylor in 2005, and as of December 2022 is one of only nine male boxers in history to do so.

As of May 2022, Crawford is ranked as the world's best active boxer, pound for pound, by ESPN, second by The Ring magazine and Boxing Writers Association of America, third by TBRB, and fourth by BoxRec. He is also ranked as the world's best active welterweight by ESPN and BoxRec, and second by The Ring and the TBRB. Crawford was named Fighter of the Year by the Boxing Writers Association of America in 2014, and by ESPN in 2014 and 2017.

Stylistically, Crawford is known for his exceptionally fast hand speed, ring IQ, punching power, counter-punching abilities and defensive skills, as well as his ability to comfortably switch hit from orthodox to southpaw.

Amateur career
Crawford took up boxing at the age of seven. He fought 70 official amateur bouts, losing 12 times. As an amateur, he defeated future world champions Mikey Garcia and Danny García. After winning three amateur tournaments shortly before the 2008 Olympics, he became the highest-ranked lightweight in the US. However, his loss to leading contender Sadam Ali thwarted his Olympic ambitions.

Amateur achievements
2006 National PAL Championships, 132 lbs – gold medalist
2006 Blue & Gold National Championships, 132 lbs – gold medalist
2007 U.S. Pan American Games Box-Offs, 132 lbs – gold medalist

Professional career

Lightweight

Early career
Crawford made his professional debut on March 14, 2008, knocking out Brian Cummings in the first round. He compiled a record of 19–0 with 15 wins by way of knockout (KO) against largely unheralded opposition.

Crawford's first notable bout was against Breidis Prescott on the undercard of the second fight between Brandon Ríos and Mike Alvarado. Prescott was originally scheduled to face WBA light welterweight champion Khabib Allakhverdiev, who withdrew with an injured elbow. Crawford was originally supposed to meet Robert Osiobe on the same card, but accepted the offer to fill in for Allakhverdiev on three-days notice. Crawford defeated the Colombian by a unanimous decision. Crawford received a purse of $125,000, whilst Prescott received $50,000. This was the first time Crawford fought a ten-round fight and his first time fighting at the 140 lb. limit.

Crawford fought Alejandro Sanabria on June 15, 2013. Held at the American Airlines Center in Dallas, Texas, the fight served as an eliminator for the WBO lightweight title and was also for the vacant WBO-NABO lightweight title. In the sixth round Crawford knocked Sanabria to the ground. Though Sanabria was able to return to his feet within the count, the fight was waved off by referee Laurence Cole, giving Crawford a technical knockout (TKO) victory.

Crawford vs. Klimov
On August 21, 2013 it was announced that Crawford would fight undefeated Russian boxer and WBO #12 ranked Andrey Klimov in another elimination bout, which would see the winner challenge WBO champion Ricky Burns. The fight was scheduled for ten rounds and took place on the undercard of Miguel Cotto vs. Delvin Rodriguez on HBO at the Amway Center in Orlando, Florida on October 5. Klimov was coming off a majority decision (MD) win over fringe contender John Molina Jr. in June 2013. After ten rounds, all three judges scored the fight 100–90 in Crawford's favour, Klimov's first defeat as a professional. According to CompuBox stats, Crawford landed 192 of 604 punches (32%), whilst Klimov landed 57 of 290 (20%). In the post-fight interview, Crawford spoke on how he went in and got the job done, "I outboxed him. It was easy all night long. I thought I was hurting him all night long. I was never in any trouble and I thought he was in trouble." Due to Klimov's lack of action, it prompted a member of his team to call him a 'coward' after round eight in the corner.

Crawford vs. Burns
Crawford traveled to Scotland five months later to take on 30 year old Ricky Burns for the WBO lightweight title on March 1, 2014. Burns' promoter, Eddie Hearn, said he was pleased to bring the fight to Scotland, and admitted it was Burns' toughest fight to date. Crawford  won the fight, boxing well on the outside and picking his shots against Burns, winning his first world title. The judges scored the fight 117–111, and 116–112 both in favour of Crawford. Burns praised Crawford after the fight, simply stating, "The better man won." Over the twelve rounds, Crawford landed 213 of 811 punches thrown (26%) but landed 41% of his power punches. Burns landed 76 of his 552 thrown (14%) and landed no more than 7 power punches per round.

Crawford vs. Gamboa
Fighting for the first time as a professional in his hometown of Omaha, Nebraska, Crawford made his first title defense against 2004 Cuban Olympic gold medalist and former unified featherweight titleholder Yuriorkis Gamboa, who was a slight favourite going into the fight. This was only the second title fight ever held in Omaha, the first being in 1972, when heavyweight champion Joe Frazier defeated the Omaha/Council Bluffs product Ron Stander by fourth-round TKO. Gamboa entered having not fought in over a year. The fight was announced on May 6 and took place at the CenturyLink Center on June 28, 2014. Crawford weighed in 134.8 pounds, slightly heavier than Gamboa at 134.4 pounds.

Gamboa won the early rounds using his speed advantage, but Crawford eventually adjusted, knocking Gamboa down once in the fifth round, again in the eighth, and finally twice in the ninth to secure a TKO win in front of an audience of 10,943. Crawford stated after the fight "I was warming up, getting used to his style in the first couple of rounds. I just wanted to test him out, I felt like I could make an adjustment with my jab, because he's always dropping his left hand. I thought I could get him with my jab in the southpaw stance." At the time of stoppage, Crawford was ahead 78–72, 78–72, 77–73 on the judges' scorecards. In an interview in July 2016, Crawford stated that Gamboa was still his toughest fight to date.

Crawford vs. Beltrán
Crawford made his second defense of the WBO title against The Ring magazine #1 contender Ray Beltrán. The winner of the bout would become The Ring's lightweight champion.  The fight was held in front of 11,127 at The CenturyLink Center in Omaha, Nebraska on November 29, 2014. Crawford retained his world title earning a twelve-round UD win. The final judges' scorecards read 120–108, and 119–109 twice in favour of Crawford. After the fight, Crawford announced his intentions to leave the lightweight division to fight as a light welterweight. The fight averaged 836,000 viewers on HBO and peaked at 936,000 viewers. It was considered a disappointment because the co-feature which saw Evgeny Gradovich draw with Jayson Velez drew an average 865,000 viewers and peaked just over 1 million.

Crawford was named the 2014 'Fighter of the Year' by ESPN and the Boxing Writers Association of America, after dethroning Burns and becoming lineal lightweight champion.

Light welterweight

Crawford vs. Dulorme
On March 6, 2015 ESPN reported that Crawford would debut as a light welterweight, challenging for the vacant WBO title at the College Park Center in Arlington, Texas against 25 year old Thomas Dulorme on April 18. At the press conference, Crawford told Dulorme, "Come prepared because I am going to be ready. [The fans] should expect a spectacular victory. This is my second world title at a different weight, and I am really going to be up for it. I will be prepared. I am always ready and prepared for any fight." The fight was stopped after Dulorme was knocked down three times in the sixth round, granting Crawford a TKO victory and the WBO title. Dulorme started off aggressive, but was unable to land much as Crawford remianed defensive. Referee Rafael Ramos stopped the fight at 1 minute, 51 seconds of the round. The fight averaged 1.004 million viewers on HBO.

Crawford vs. Jean
Top Rank announced on August 20 that Crawford would make his first defence at the CenturyLink Center in Nebraska, Omaha, on October 24 against Montreal based 33 year old contender Dierry Jean. Jean's only loss previous loss as professional had come in 2014 against light welterweight titlist Lamont Peterson, in Peterson's hometown of Washington, D.C. after which Jean dropped down to lightweight where he won four fights in a row. Crawford knocked Jean out in the tenth round in front of an audience of 11,020. Crawford landed 169 total punches out of 533 thrown, and 40% of his power shots. Over the last three rounds, Crawford out-landed Jean 59 to 9. After the fight, Crawford stated that he was ready for former eight-division world champion Manny Pacquiao, "I'm ready. Bob, make it happen. I'm ready. I'm gonna let my handlers, Cameron Dunkin and Brian McIntyre, talk to Bob Arum and Team Pacquiao, and let's see if we can make it happen." Crawford was ahead on all three judges' scorecards at the time of stoppage (89–80, 90–79 twice). The fight was broadcast on HBO, drawing an average of 1.071 million viewers and peaked at 1.2 million.

Crawford vs. Lundy
His next fight took place before a sellout crowd of 5,092 at the Theater of Madison Square Garden on February 27, 2016 against Hank Lundy. Panned as a second-rate fight for the undefeated Crawford, the bout picked up considerable steam in the weeks leading up to the telecast as Lundy boldly predicted a knockout win. Crawford successfully defended his light welterweight title with a fifth-round TKO of Lundy. Crawford connected with 89 of 247 punches (36%), compared to 47 of 411 for Lundy (22%). Lundy won a fast-paced first round, finally sending Lundy  down in a corner in the fifth round. He beat the count, but the bout was soon stopped by referee Steve Willis at 2 minutes, 9 seconds. Crawford spoke out about his feud with Lundy on social media, "He and I had gone back and forth on Twitter for like a year. I just wanted to shut him up for good." Crawford earned $1.21 million and Lundy earned a $150,000 purse. Although there was a lot of tension pre-fight, Lundy approached Crawford after the fight and showed respect. The fight averaged 982,000 viewers on HBO and peaked just over 1 million viewers.

Crawford vs. Postol
On May 3, 2016 it was finally confirmed that Crawford and WBC champion Viktor Postol had officially signed a contract for the highly anticipated light welterweight unification fight on July 23 at the MGM Grand in Las Vegas. Both fighters entered the ring with a matched record of 28 wins, no losses. Both men also entered the MGM Grand Garden Arena for the first time in their respective careers. Crawford won by UD and unified two light welterweight world titles before a crowd of 7,027. Crawford also claimed the vacant Ring magazine and lineal titles. Crawford scored two flash knockdowns in the fifth round, with all three scorecards reading 118–107 twice, and 117–108. Postol was penalised for rabbit punching in the eleventh round when he hit Crawford with a right hand behind the head for which Postol was penalized one point, adding to Crawford's advantage. With the victory, Crawford staked his indisputable claim to division supremacy and set himself up for bigger fights, possibly against a returning Manny Pacquiao. Over twelve rounds, Crawford landed 141 of his 388 punches thrown (36%), and Postol landed 83 of 244 thrown (34%).

In the post-fight interview, Postol praised Crawford, saying "I thought it was a good fight between two technicians, but he was quicker than me. He is one of the best fighters in the world. I just didn't have the answers for him." Crawford also praised his trainer Brian McIntyre, "Freddie Roach and Postol said that Freddie would outcoach my coach, but you tell 'em who got outcoached tonight." McIntyre revealed the plan was to keep Postol moving, which would have eliminated his jab and right hand. Crawford's purse for the fight was $1.3 million. Postol earned $675,000 for his part. Some sources stated the fight generated 50,000 PPV buys on HBO. A replay was shown later in the week and drew 378,000, considered a weak number.

Crawford vs. Molina
Crawford was not due to fight next until 2017, however due to the Golovkin-Jacobs fight being postponed to early 2017, this freed up the December 10 date for HBO. Arum confirmed Crawford would take the date and look at potential opponents, including the then IBF champion Eduard Troyanovsky and Antonio Orozco. Arum announced a deal was in place for a fight between Crawford and 33 year old contender John Molina Jr. on December 10, 2016 at Crawford's hometown at CenturyLink Center in Omaha, Nebraska. Molina had previously defeated Russian contender Ruslan Provodnikov by UD in a twelve-round June 2016 fight, in which he  also claimed the vacant WBO International light welterweight title. Molina weighed 144lb at the official weigh-in which meant he lost the right to fight for Crawford's world titles. Had Crawford lost the fight, he would have lost his belts. For the fight to go ahead, Molina gave $400,000 of his purse to Crawford, adding to his already agreed purse of $1.5m.

Crawford held onto his titles, stopping Molina in the eighth round in front of a large home crowd in Omaha. Crawford moved around the ring for most of the fight, jabbing, holding and pot-shotting Molina. Referee Mark Nelson halted the fight in the eight round after Molina received three consecutive hits to the head. In the post-fight interview, Crawford felt he should be the 2016 'Fighter of the Year' for his wins over Molina, Lundy and Postol, "I feel like I got it. I just have to wait until the results come in." Crawford also reiterated his desire to unify the division before a possible move up to welterweight. Crawford landed 184 punches from 419 thrown, Molina landed 41 of 287 thrown, a 14% connect rate. The fight drew an average 806,000 viewers and peaked at 871,000 viewers on HBO.

Crawford vs. Diaz
Bob Arum spoke to ESPN in early February 2017 about Crawford's next defence and possible opponents. He said that HBO had set a May 20 date for the fight and the venue would most likely be in Crawford's hometown, Omaha. Mexican boxer Antonio Orozco, one of Crawford's mandatory challengers and Olympic gold medalist Felix Diaz, who had been calling out Crawford, were the names mentioned. He went on to explain how Orozco's promoters seemed to have little interest in the fight. Lou DiBella, promoter of Diaz, was eager to make a fight happen. Arum spoke to The Ring on March 1 saying that Crawford's opponent had been narrowed down to Diaz or Adrian Granados. Amir Imam, ranked number 1 by the WBC was also in the mix, but Arum said that he found it difficult to make a deal with his promoter, Don King. Terms were finally agreed on March 22 for Crawford vs. Diaz at the Prudential Center in Newark, New Jersey on May 20. Contracts were to be signed shortly after. A week after the fight was announced, the location was changed. The new venue was confirmed to be Madison Square Garden in New York. 

In front of a crowd of 8,026, Crawford retained his world titles after Diaz's trainer, Joel Díaz stopped the fight after round ten. Towards the end, Diaz did close to nothing, leaning against the ropes. This was mostly due to his vision, as his right eye was nearly closed and his left eye was also badly swollen. Crawford used his jab for most of the fight, and used it to control the pace and help him move around the ring in his southpaw stance. Joel Díaz said in the post-fight interview that he had pulled his fighter out because he was taking too much punishment. Also in the post-fight interview, Crawford said, "It's not up to me. But everybody wants to know who's the next guy that Terence Crawford wants to fight. I'll fight anybody. It doesn't matter who it is." He then called out Keith Thurman. Promoter Bob Arum mentioned Crawford would likely fight again in the summer, against Julius Indongo, where the winner would be crowned the undisputed light welterweight champion.

According to CompuBox punch stats, Crawford landed 193 of his 520 punches thrown (37.1%). In that figure, he landed 59.1% of his power punches (139 of 235 thrown). Diaz landed 69 of 346 (19.9%). At the time of stoppage, judges Glenn Feldman and Steve Weisfeld scored the bout 100–90 and judge Julie Lederman scores it 99–91, all in favour of Crawford. According to Nielsen, the fight averaged 961,000 viewers on HBO's World Championship Boxing and peaked at 1.036m viewers. It was the most viewed fight on HBO so far that year.

Crawford vs. Indongo

On July 1, 2017 Top Rank announced that a light welterweight unification fight between Crawford, and WBA (Unified) and IBF champion Julius Indongo was agreed upon to take place on August 19 at the Pinnacle Bank Arena in Lincoln, Nebraska live on ESPN in the U.S. and Sky Sports in the U.K. The projected unification of every major world title in boxing (WBA, WBC, IBF, WBO) will determine the light welterweight division's first undisputed champion since Kostya Tszyu in 2004, and the first time all the aforementioned titles have been at stake in a single fight since Bernard Hopkins vs. Jermain Taylor in 2005. Both fighters paid over $100,000 U.S. dollars in sanctioning fees. Crawford entered the fight as a heavy favourite to win.

In front of a home crowd of 12,121, Crawford became the undisputed champion at light welterweight after knocking out Indongo in round three. The final punch was a left hook to the right side of the body, which immediately dropped Indongo. Referee Jack Reiss counted to 10 and promptly called an end after 1 minute and 38 seconds. Indongo also touched the canvas during round one, but the referee ruled it a slip. Additionally, Indongo was knocked down and received a count after a left from Crawford during round two.

According to CompuBox stats, Crawford landed 26 of his 75 punches thrown (35%), while Indongo landed 13 of 74 thrown (18%). Both boxers earned an undisclosed 7-figure purse. Following the fight, Indongo stated "When he hit me like that, my mind was gone" about Crawford's body shot. Crawford stated that he had yet to make a decision on the next step in his career but there was speculation about him moving up to the welterweight division or defending his light welterweight titles against Mikey Garcia. The card averaged 965,000 viewers on ESPN.

Mere days after the fight, the IBF ordered a fight between Crawford and their mandatory challenger, Sergey Lipinets. Lipinets was named Indongo's mandatory challenger in December 2016, but Indongo was given an exemption to allow the unification fight with Crawford to happen. Lipinets stated that the IBF title was "stolen from him". As Crawford didn't plan to return to the ring before the IBF's deadline, he vacated the IBF title just 11 days after defeating Indongo. The IBF ordered Lipinets to face Akihiro Kondo for their vacant title.

On August 31, the WBA Championships Committee revealed that they had elevated Crawford to 'Super' champion. Article C18 of the WBA's rules stated that as Crawford holds all major titles at light welterweight, he could be elevated and deemed a 'Super' champion. The WBA, however, claimed to hold on to their policy of having only one champion per weight category and insisted an interim or regular title would not be created.

Welterweight
On October 26, 2017 Crawford officially vacated his WBO title to move up to the welterweight division. The WBO announced Crawford as the mandatory challenger to their titleholder Jeff Horn. With Horn scheduled to make a voluntary defence in December 2017 against British boxer Gary Corcoran, Crawford would not fight again in 2017. The winner of Horn vs. Cocoran was then ordered to schedule a fight against Crawford within 90 days. Arum stated he had dates in March and April 2018 on hold.

Crawford vs. Horn 
When Horn successfully made a voluntary defence of his WBO welterweight title by stopping Corcoran, this set up the fight between Crawford and Horn. Following his win, Horn was challenged to a big money fight at light middleweight by 42 year old Anthony Mundine, before eventually defending his WBO title against Crawford. Horn admitted his interest in the fight where he would be seeing a purse of around $2 million with his trainer, Glenn Rushton, also very much interested in the Mundine fight. On January 10, 2018 it was confirmed that all terms had been agreed upon for Horn to defend the WBO title in a mandatory defence against Crawford, after renegotiating the purses. The fight was being slated for April 21, 2018 at the T-Mobile Arena in Paradise, Nevada. On January 17, Arum stated the fight would likely take place at Madison Square Garden as there was no availability in Las Vegas for the dates required. In February, Arum claimed that due to other boxing events taking place around New York in April, the Crawford vs. Horn bout would take place in Las Vegas instead.

On March 14, it was reported that the fight would be postponed after Crawford suffered a hand injury whilst sparring. The fight was rescheduled to take place on June 9 at the MGM Grand Garden Arena in Paradise, Nevada. It was reported on May 24 that Horn had been involved in a car accident, involving three cars in Brisbane, however Horn himself confirmed that he was not hurt and did not suffer any injuries. Speaking to a newspaper, he said, "No one was badly hurt but it stunned me. Fortunately, I was in the car alone and my wife Jo and baby Isabelle were home. The accident was a shock but nothing is going to derail me from beating Terence Crawford. I’m very fit. I feel I’m going to peak right at fight time."

Crawford became a three-weight world champion in front of 8,112 fans in attendance after he eventually stopped Horn via TKO in round nine. At the time of the stoppage, all three judges had Crawford winning all the previous rounds. Horn lacked defense but kept coming forward, trying to look for an opening. Horn made the opening two rounds the most competitive with his aggressive style but Crawford adapted and remained the busier fighter throughout, landing the most telling shots of the bout. Horn was eventually dropped for the first time in round nine with an overhand left. After he got back up, Crawford landed a series of hard shots that caused referee Robert Byrd to stop the fight. The official time of the stoppage was 2 minutes and 33 seconds. After the bout, Crawford spoke about his welterweight debut, "Like I told you all before, I'm strong. I was way stronger than him. You all kept telling me how strong he was, so I had to go and show you. I just had to get in the ring and prove it. You saw what I did in there. My power carried up, my physicality. Now I want all the champions at welterweight." Promoter Bob Arum highly praised Crawford and compared him to Sugar Ray Leonard. According to CompuBox stats, Crawford landed 155 of 367 of punches thrown (42%). This included 47 power shots landed over the final two rounds. Horn, on the other hand, landed just 58 of 257 punches thrown (23%). Crawford earned a career-high $3 million purse and Horn also earned a career-high purse of $1.75 million.

Crawford vs. Benavidez 
Crawford's first defense of the WBO title was slated to take place on October 13, 2018. Early reports stated his likely opponent would be former WBA interim light welterweight champion José Benavidez (27–0, 18 KOs). On September 6, despite having two years left of his contract, Crawford signed a new multi-year deal with Top Rank. On signing the extension, Crawford said, "I am the best fighter in the world, hands down. ESPN is the biggest brand in sports and Top Rank is the biggest promotional company in boxing. This was a no-brainer for me and my team. All of the super fights that the world wants to see will happen. Like I've said before, I want all of the champions in the welterweight division." The fight against Benavidez was also announced by Top Rank to take place at the CHI Health Center in Omaha, Nebraska.

In front of 13,323 in attendance, the largest crowd he had drawn to date, Crawford came on strong in the final round to score a twelfth-round KO win to retain his WBO welterweight title. The fight was halted at 2 minutes and 42 seconds. Crawford used an in-and-out style of fighting to land his shots and then got away before Benavidez could hit him. Towards the end of round twelve, Crawford knocked down Benavidez, who fought with an injured knee, with a left-right combination, the final punch being a right uppercut. After Benavidez got back to his feet, Crawford landed a flurry of punches until referee Celestino Ruiz stepped in. Crawford landed head and body combinations earlier in the fight which forced Benavidez to take a step back. Crawford credited the body shots, saying, "That takes something out of you every time. That's what slowed him down. You could tell every time he was shaking his head. I knew it would take its toll in the later rounds." At the time of stoppage, Crawford was ahead 110–99, 108–101 and 107–102 on all three judges' scorecards. According to CompuBox, Crawford landed 186 of 579 punches thrown (32%) and Benavidez landed 92 of his 501 thrown (18%). Benavidez landed 8 punches per round. CompuBox Historical showed that Crawford's previous 10 opponents landed only 7 per round. Crawford earned $3.625 million, his career-highest, compared to Benavidez's $500,000 purse. The near two-hour telecast averaged 2,245,000 viewers on ESPN.

Crawford vs. Khan 
On November 16, two-time Lithuanian Olympian Egidijus Kavaliauskas knocked out Roberto Arriaza in the third round of their bout. After the fight, Arum hinted Kavaliauskas would likely challenge Crawford for the WBO welterweight title in early 2019. Kavaliauskas stated he wanted to fight the best in the division and called out Crawford. A week later, it was reported 37 year old, former world champion Luis Collazo (38–7, 20 KOs) was in line to challenge Crawford, in what would be Crawford's first of three bouts in 2019. The fight would main event a Top Rank card on ESPN on March 23, 2019 at Madison Square Garden in New York. Prior to pursuing the fight with Collazo, Carl Moretti told RingTv they offered Danny García a guaranteed $3 million purse to fight Crawford on the same date on ESPN PPV, which would have included a share of the revenue generated. The offer was made to Angel García, who told Moretti he would discuss the offer with Danny, but ultimately never replied to Top Rank's offer. According to Moretti, the offer was made two weeks before García's fight with Adrián Granados was announced.

Although Collazo had agreed the terms to fight, Crawford was yet to sign the agreement. On December 3, it was reported that Top Rank had offered former unified light welterweight champion Amir Khan a guaranteed $5 million purse, plus a percentage of PPV revenue, to fight Crawford on March 23, 2019. Khan explained how he was considering the fight as it would be a good pay day and for the WBO welterweight title. He stated the fight with Kell Brook, who he was in negotiations with over a big domestic showdown, could still take place at a later date. On January 4, 2019 with no opponent announced, Crawford's scheduled return to the ring was pushed back to April 20, 2019. A few hours after, it was reported that Khan accepted Top Rank's offer to fight Crawford on April 20. A press conference was set for January 15, in London and the fight was made official to take place on ESPN PPV on April 20, 2019. Khan admitted it was a hard decision to make when choosing to fight Crawford over long-time rival Brook, as a bout with Crawford would see his legacy enhanced further. Khan also believed winning another world title against a consensus pound for pound boxer would be a bigger achievement than defeating Brook. Khan also revealed he would return to veteran trainer Virgil Hunter for the Crawford bout. Hunter was unable to train Khan for his previous two bouts due a health scare. After the pressers concluded, New York's Madison Square Garden was chosen as the venue for the bout. BT Sport in the U.K. picked up the event, announcing it would take place on their PPV platform.

The match took place on April 20, 2019. Crawford knocked down Khan 2 minutes into the first round with a sharp right hand followed by a left hook and came close to a second knockdown, with Khan seemingly being saved by the bell. Despite making adjustments in rounds two and three, Khan was easily outboxed by the sharper and faster Crawford. The champion switched to southpaw in round four and increased the pressure on Khan. 40 seconds into round six, Crawford hit Khan with an accidental low blow. Despite being given five minutes by referee David Fields to recover, Khan's trainer Virgil Hunter informed the referee that Khan would not be able to continue, giving Crawford the win via TKO. Before the stoppage, Crawford led on the scorecards by 50–44, and 49–45 twice. According to CompuBox stats, Crawford landed 88 of his 211 punches (42%) while Khan landed 44 of his 182 punches (24%). At the post-fight press conference, Crawford accused Khan of "quitting" in the fight, which Khan denied.

Crawford vs. Kavaliauskas

Having called for the opportunity since November 2016, Egidijus Kavaliauskas eventually faced Crawford on December 14, 2019. Early in the fight, Crawford appeared to have been knocked down, however it was not ruled a knockdown. After a close first half of the fight eventually, Crawford won by stoppage in the ninth. After dropping the Lithuanian in the seventh round with an overhand right, and twice further in the ninth with explosive punches, the referee intervened to save Kavaliauskas further punishment.

Crawford vs. Brook
On August 25, 2020, Bob Arum revealed that discussions were ongoing for Crawford to face the former IBF welterweight titlist Kell Brook, with November 14, 2020, being the targeted date. Crawford's camp first attempted to arrange a fight with Josesito López, who however opted to face Maurice Hooker. The fight was officially announced on October 6, 2020, and was held at the MGM Grand Conference Center in Paradise, Nevada. Crawford entered the fight as a significant favorite, with most odds-makers having him as a -1439 favorite. Crawford won the fight by a fourth-round technical knockout, stopping the former IBF titlist at the 1:14 minute mark. He out-landed Brook 36 to 26 in total punches landed, and 20 to 12 in power punches landed. Brook was leading on the scorecards at the time of the stoppage, with two judges having the fight 29-28 in his favor, while the third judge awarded the same scorecard to Crawford.

The fight, which was broadcast by ESPN, draw an average audience of 2,029,000 viewers and attracted a peak audience of 2,078,000. Crawford earned $3 million for the bout, a 60% split of the purse.

Crawford vs. Porter

On July 22, 2021, the WBO ordered that Crawford defend his welterweight title against the #2 ranked WBO welterweight contender Shawn Porter. The former two-time welterweight title holder was seen as the biggest challenge in Crawford's career up to that point, with ESPN describing Porter as "a quantum leap in competition". As the two sides were unable to negotiate the terms of the fight, the WBO set a purse bid for September 2, 2021, which was later postponed until September 14. Crawford and Porter would adhere to a 60-40 purse split, rather than the usual 80-20 split for mandated matches, taking into account the earnings from their three previous fights. On September 14, it was announced that a deal had been agreed to stage the fight on November 20 at Mandalay Bay in Las Vegas, airing on ESPN+ PPV.

On fight night, Crawford showcased his switch-hitting ability, fighting in both the orthodox and southpaw stances. Both men were cut from accidental head clashes. In the tenth round, he caught Porter with a straight left, sending the latter to the canvas. Crawford scored another knockdown shortly after, prompting Porter's corner to throw in the towel, handing Crawford a tenth-round technical knockout victory. Crawford out-landed Porter in punches with 98 strikes to 79, although Porter had landed more power punches (67 to Crawford's 65). Crawford was leading on the judges' scorecards at the time of the stoppage, with scores of 86–85, 86–85 and 87–84. According to ESPN reports, Crawford earned upward of $6 million for the bout, a 60% split of the total fight purse. During his post-fight interview, Crawford announced his split with promoter Bob Arum and departure from Top Rank, opting instead to test free agency.

Crawford vs. Avanesyan
On October 21, 2022, Crawford was announced to make the sixth defense of his WBO welterweight championship against top contender David Avanesyan on December 10, 2022, at the CHI Health Center in Omaha, Nebraska, that will headline a BLK Prime Boxing PPV. Crawford stopped Avanesyan with a  right hand to the jaw, winning in the 6th round. After the fight, Crawford stated it was a one fight deal and he is still a free agent.

Crawford vs. Rocha
On February 27, 2023, Crawford was ordered by the WBO to make a mandatory title defense against the once-defeated Alexis Rocha.

Legal issues
On September 21, 2016, Crawford was found guilty of criminal mischief and disorderly conduct due to an April incident at a local car body shop. Crawford had made a partial payment but refused to pay the remainder after he wasn't satisfied with the work being done and the amount being charged. He started to lower the car himself, damaging the hydraulic lift. At the hearing, Crawford was sentenced to 90 days in jail, but would be serving 53 days. Crawford was incarcerated for only 8 hours, before being released after his attorney posted a $10,000 bond. Crawford's conviction for criminal mischief and his 90 day jail sentence were reversed on appeal.

Professional boxing record

Pay-per-view bouts

See also
List of world lightweight boxing champions
List of world light-welterweight boxing champions
List of world welterweight boxing champions
List of boxing triple champions

Notes

References

External links

Terence Crawford profile at Top Rank
Terence Crawford profile at HBO
Terence Crawford profile at Cyber Boxing Zone

1987 births
Living people
American male boxers
African-American boxers
Boxers from Nebraska
Sportspeople from Omaha, Nebraska
World lightweight boxing champions
World light-welterweight boxing champions
World welterweight boxing champions
World Boxing Organization champions
World Boxing Council champions
World Boxing Association champions
International Boxing Federation champions
The Ring (magazine) champions
21st-century African-American sportspeople
20th-century African-American people